The Memphis–City Combined Statistical Area, TN–MS–AR (CSA) is the commercial and cultural hub of The Mid-South or Ark-Miss-Tenn. The census-defined combined statistical area covers ten counties in three states – Tennessee, Mississippi, and Arkansas. As of census 2010 the MSA had a population of 1,324,108. The Forrest City Micropolitan area was added to the Memphis area in 2012 to form the Memphis–Forrest City Combined Statistical area and had a population of 1,369,548 according to census estimates. The greater Mid-South area as a whole has a population of 2.4 million according to 2013 census estimates. This area is covered by Memphis local news channels and includes the Missouri Bootheel, Northeast Arkansas, West Tennessee, and North Mississippi.

Regional identity
The Memphis Metro area is known locally as the Mid-South. Culturally, the Memphis Metropolitan area is more associated with the Deep South and even more specifically the Mississippi Delta than it is the Upland South, which is the case with Tennessee's other large cities. Memphis, Tennessee, is the largest city in the Deep South, third largest in the Southeastern United States, and eighth largest in the Southern United States as a whole. African-Americans make up nearly half the population of the metro area. The Mid-South has the highest percentage of African-Americans of all large metro areas with at least a million people. It is second when metro areas of under a million people are factored in after the Jackson-Vicksburg-Brookhaven, MS Combined Statistical Area. The metro area is blue collar in nature and most of its growth can be attributed to its logistical infrastructure. Recently, however, more companies with technology backgrounds such as Electrolux and Mitsubishi have begun making inroads in the Memphis area.

Economy

The Memphis area enjoys a diverse and robust economy. Well positioned on America's largest river and located near the population center of the United States; Memphis is known as America's distribution hub. FedEx is headquartered in Memphis and uses the Memphis International Airport as its global superhub facility making the airport the busiest cargo airport in the United States. UPS also uses Memphis as a major hub. The area is also home to one of the United States largest intermodal logistics centers. This includes being the third largest trucking corridor, fourth largest inland port, and third largest in class I railroad services. The Mid-South has the largest percentage of people employed in logistics in the U.S. The Mid-South is also home to many fortune 500 and 1000 companies such as FedEx, AutoZone, Regions Bank, ServiceMaster, BUPERS, First Horizon Bank and International Paper. Furthermore, companies such as Nike, Baskin Robbins, Sharp, and Hewlett Packard operate large distribution centers out of Memphis.

Healthcare has begun to play a major role in the Mid-South's economy accounting for one in nine jobs. There are nineteen hospitals with over 4,100 beds in the Mid-South. The area is also home to St. Jude Children's Research Hospital, a Nobel Prize winning hospital with over 1,200 scientists working there and the University of Tennessee Health Science Center.

Tourism is also a major contributor to the Mid-South's economy with the region being known as the birthplace of Rock and Roll and Blues. Over eight million people visit the Memphis metropolitan area every year for tourist related activities. Over four million people visit Beale Street every year making it the most visited attraction in Tennessee. The Memphis Zoo is one of only four zoos in the U.S. to feature a giant panda and is routinely ranked as one of the best zoos in America. The Tunica casino resort area in Mississippi has over twelve million visitors annually and is the third largest gaming area in the U.S. after Las Vegas and Atlantic City. It also contains a lake beach at Sardis Lake near Batesville, Mississippi.

Colleges and Universities

Four Year Colleges and Graduate Schools
 University of Memphis
 Rhodes College
 Christian Brothers University
 LeMoyne–Owen College
 Baptist College of Health Sciences
 University of Tennessee Health Science Center
 Southern College of Optometry
 Rust College

Two Year Colleges
 Southwest Tennessee Community College
 Mid-South Community College
 Phillips Community College of the University of Arkansas
 Crowley's Ridge College
 Northwest Mississippi Community College

Transportation

Airports:
 Memphis International Airport
 General DeWitt Spain Airport
 Olive Branch Airport
 Millington Municipal Airport
Freeways:
 Interstate 40 
 Interstate 240 (Inner Beltway)
 Interstate 55
 Interstate 69
 Interstate 269 (Outer Beltway connecting Shelby County to Fayette and DeSoto Counties)
 Interstate 22 (Connects Hickory Hill and DeSoto County, Mississippi, to Birmingham, Alabama, and Atlanta, Georgia)
 Bill Morris Parkway (Connects Piperton, Collierville, Germantown, Southwind, and Hickory Hill to I-240)
 Sam Cooper Blvd (Connects East Memphis and Bartlett to Midtown)
 Tennessee State Route 300 (Located in the Frayser area, connects Watkins and the I-240 loop to U.S. Route 51)
 Interstate 555 (Connects Memphis to Jonesboro, Arkansas)
 Tennessee State Route 14 (Connects Raleigh to Memphis)

Composition
The area includes the following counties:

Communities

Arkansas

 Crittenden County* Pop. 49,746 
 St. Francis County* Pop. 27,260
 Lee County, Arkansas Pop. 10,015
 Phillips County, Arkansas Pop. 20,399
 Cross County, Arkansas Pop. 17,548
 Poinsett County, Arkansas Pop. 24,145
 Mississippi County, Arkansas Pop. 44,765
 Craighead County, Arkansas Pop. 101,488
 Greene County, Arkansas Pop. 43,097
 Clay County, Arkansas Pop. 15,402

 Mississippi

 Benton County* Pop. 8,571
 Desoto County* Pop. 168,240
 Tunica County* Pop. 10,560
 Tate County* Pop. 28,373
 Marshall County* Pop. 36,515
 Panola County, Mississippi Pop. 34,402
 Lafayette County, Mississippi Pop. 51,318
 Alcorn County, Mississippi Pop. 37,316
 Tippah County, Mississippi Pop. 22,084
 Quitman County, Mississippi Pop. 8,223
 Coahoma County, Mississippi Pop. 25,182
 Union County, Mississippi Pop. 27,754
 Lee County, Mississippi Pop. 85,340
 Pontotoc County, Mississippi Pop. 30,897
 Prentiss County, Mississippi Pop. 25,388
 Tishomingo County, Mississippi Pop. 19,491

Tennessee

 Tipton County* Pop. 61,586
 Shelby County* Pop. 939,465
 Fayette County* Pop. 38,690
 Hardeman County, Tennessee Pop. 26,306
 McNairy County, Tennessee Pop. 26,140
 Madison County, Tennessee Pop. 98,733
 Haywood County, Tennessee Pop. 18,224
 Chester County, Tennessee Pop. 17,321
 Crockett County, Tennessee Pop. 14,591
 Gibson County, Tennessee Pop. 49,457
 Dyer County, Tennessee Pop. 38,213
 Weakley County, Tennessee Pop. 34,450
 Obion County, Tennessee Pop. 31,131 
 Lake County, Tennessee Pop. 7,731

Counties marked with* are officially included in the Memphis-Forrest City CSA.

Cities and towns

Places with more than 100,000 inhabitants
Memphis, Tennessee (Principal City)

Places with 50,000 to 100,000 inhabitants
Bartlett, Tennessee
Southaven, Mississippi
Collierville, Tennessee

Places with 25,000 to 50,000 inhabitants
Germantown, Tennessee
Olive Branch, Mississippi
Horn Lake, Mississippi
West Memphis, Arkansas

Places with 5,000 to 25,000 inhabitants
Marion, Arkansas
Wynne, Arkansas
Hernando, Mississippi
Lakeland, Tennessee
Arlington, Tennessee
Millington, Tennessee
Atoka, Tennessee
Covington, Tennessee
Senatobia, Mississippi
Holly Springs, Mississippi
Oakland, Tennessee
Munford, Tennessee

Places with 500 to 5,000 inhabitants

Places with fewer than 500 inhabitants

Unincorporated places

Demographics
According to U.S.census estimates for 2013, there were 1,371,110 people residing within the CSA. The racial makeup of the CSA was 45.2% non-Hispanic White, 47.3% African American, 0.5% Native American, 2.2% Asian, <0.1% Pacific Islander, and Hispanic or Latino of any race were 5.1% of the population. Memphis is the only metropolitan/combined statistical area in the United States with over a million people to have a plurality/majority African American population. The Jackson, Mississippi metropolitan area also has this distinction but only has around half a million people.

The median income for a household in the MSA was $47,344 and the mean was $65,463. The median income for a family was $57,780 and the mean was $76,126. The per capita income for the MSA was $24,675.

See also

Tennessee census statistical areas
Mississippi census statistical areas
Arkansas census statistical areas

References

External links
 Greater Memphis Chamber
 Greater Memphis Laws

 
Metropolitan areas of Tennessee
Metropolitan areas of Mississippi
Metropolitan areas of Arkansas